In agriculture, continuous harvest is the availability of a crop over an extended period during the growing season. Each crop has a harvest window during which it is ready for picking. Some are harvested by removing the whole plant, for example, cutting a head of lettuce. Others can be picked over varying periods: peas and corn may have a window of two weeks, cucumbers six or eight, tomatoes produce until the end of the  season.

To provide a season-long continuous harvest of a crop with a shorter harvest window, succession planting techniques are used, including multiple plantings at different times, and planting of cultivars with different maturity dates. In this way, with effective timing, a new planting or variety of a crop is always coming into maturity as a previous one finishes.

References

 Ripening indices and harvesting times of different olive cultivars for continuous harvest. Scientia Horticulturae.
 The effect of new continuous harvest technology of ramie (Boehmeria nivea L. Gaud.) on fiber yield and quality. Industrial Crops and Products.
 Continuous harvest of marine microalgae using electrolysis: effect of pulse waveform of polarity exchange. Bioprocess and Biosystems Engineering.
 Evergreen Agriculture: a robust approach to sustainable food security in Africa. Food Security.

External links

 NCAT – National Center for Appropriate Technology
 Continuousharvest.com

Crops
Harvest